Altobello Melone ( 1490–1491 – before 3 May 1543) was an Italian painter of the Renaissance.

Biography
Melone was born in Cremona. His work merges Lombard and Mannerist styles. In Cremona, he encountered the elder Girolamo Romanino. He was commissioned in December 1516 to fresco the Cathedral of Cremona, work which continued until 1518. His contract required that his frescoes be more beautiful than those of his predecessor, Boccaccio Boccaccino. He worked alongside Giovanni Francesco Bembo and Paolo da Drizzona. Francesco Prata was influenced by Melone.

Melone contributed frescoes to the Cathedral of Cremona in 1516. The Lamentation in the Pinacoteca di Brera comes in all probability from the church of Saint Lorenzo in Brescia and is dated 1512. The stylistic convergence with Romanino is particularly obvious, such that the contemporary Venetian Marcantonio Michiel describes the Cremonese painter as a "disciple of Armanin".

Moreover, in his masterpiece frescoes, Melone aims to be an interpreter of the anticlassicism and "expressionist" language emerging in the work of Romanino. The seven scenes realized by Altobello evince a new forcefulness – the Massacre of the Innocents is emblematic of this quality, which is manifest in the gestures and in the grotesque transformation of the faces.

Selected works
 Madonna and Child with Saint John (c. 1510) – Accademia Carrara, Bergamo
 Adoration of the Christ Child (c. 1510) – Kunsthaus, Zürich (warehouse)
 Madonna with Child (c. 1511) – Pinacoteca Ambrosiana, Milan 
 Lamentation over the Dead Christ (1512) – Pinacoteca di Brera, Milan
 Transfiguration – Szépművészeti Múzeum, Budapest 
 Portrait of Gentleman (Cesare Borgia) – Accademia Carrara, Bergamo
 Embrace of Lovers – Gemäldegalerie, Dresden
 Embrace of Lovers – Szépművészeti Múzeum, Budapest
 Adoration of the Christ Child (1512–1514) – Museo Berenziano, Cremona
 Portrait (1512–1515) – Pinacoteca di Brera, Milan
 Lamentation over the Dead Christ – Archiepiscopal Picture gallery, Milan 
 Christ Bearing the Cross (c. 1515) – National Gallery, London 
 Mercy – Pinacoteca Tosio Martinengo, Brescia 
 Road to Emmaus (c. 1516–1517) – National Gallery, London
 Saint Helena Travels to Jerusalem in Search of the True Cross – private collection 
 Frescoes in Cremona Cathedral (1516–1518)
Flight into Egypt
Massacre of the Innocents
Last Supper
Washing of Christ's Feet
Agony in the Garden
Capture of Christ
Christ in front of Caiaphas
 Adoration of the Shepherds (c. 1518) – Frescoes detached, Pinacoteca di Brera, Milan 
 Resurrection (c. 1517) – Private collection
 Simonino from Trento (c. 1521) – Castello del Buonconsiglio, Trento
 Madonna and Child (1520–1522) – Accademia Carrara, Bergamo 
 Madonna and Child with Saints John Nicholas –  Civic Museum Wing Ponzone, Cremona
 Narcissus at Fountain –  Städel, Frankfurt
 Saint Prospero, Bishop of Reggio Emilia – Hatfield House
 Madonna del Gatto  –  Church of San Nicolò, Isola Dovarese, province of Cremona, Lombardy

References

Sources

1500s births
16th-century deaths
16th-century Italian painters
Italian male painters
Painters from Cremona
Italian Renaissance painters